The Baltimore Blast is an American professional indoor soccer team based in Baltimore, Maryland, United States. The team is a part of the Major Arena Soccer League.

Including one championship victory as the original Baltimore Blast, the team has won 10 championships since its founding in 1980. Beginning with the 2017-2018 season, home games have been played at Towson University's SECU Arena. The Blast previously played at Royal Farms Arena in downtown Baltimore. Team colors are red and gold. Their current head coach is David Bascome, who took over from Danny Kelly who held the position for 15 years.

History

NPSL, MISL II and MISL III years
The team was founded by North Carolina-based software executive Bill Stealey as the Baltimore Spirit at the end of July 1992 and joined the National Professional Soccer League. The team replaced the earlier Baltimore Blast, who folded along with the original Major Indoor Soccer League. When the team was purchased by Ed Hale, a former owner of the original team, the Spirit were renamed the Blast on July 10, 1998 (Hale had the rights to the Blast name, hence the reason why the team decided to change its name) and joined the new MISL II in 2001.  After the MISL II folded in 2008, the team announced it would be joining the new National Indoor Soccer League, which would later acquire the rights to, and became, the third version of the MISL.

Shift to MASL
One day after the 2013–2014 MISL Championship final, USL President Tim Holt announced a number of teams would not be returning to the MISL the following year. The franchise announced on April 2, 2014, that it would not return to the Major Indoor Soccer League (MISL) after its contract with the United Soccer Leagues (USL), owners of the circuit, expired following the 2013–14 season. It was officially announced the Blast would be one of six teams joining the Professional Arena Soccer League (later renamed the Major Arena Soccer League) in the 2014–2015 season.

In their first two seasons as a member of MASL, the Blast would win 33 out of 39 games. They placed first in the Eastern Division in both the 2014-2015 and 2015-2016 seasons, played in the 2015 and 2016 championship series and won the 2016 series over Soles de Sonora two games to none. The Blast repeated as Newman Cup Champions in 2017, again winning the final series over Soles de Sonora two games to one. In 2018, the Blast won their third straight championship, defeating the Monterrey Flash 4-3 in the final.

Attempted launch of the IPL
On February 18, 2016, Blast owner Ed Hale announced his intentions to leave the Major Arena Soccer League and form a new league.

On May 3, 2016, the expansion franchise Florida Tropics SC held a press conference stating they would be joining the IPL. At the press conference Ed Hale was announced as the chairman of the league, and Sam Fantauzzo, former owner of the Rochester Lancers, was announced as the first commissioner of the league. It was announced that the St. Louis Ambush, Baltimore Blast, and Harrisburg Heat had "resigned" from the MASL.

On August 29, 2016, the Blast, Heat, Ambush re-entered the MASL with the expansion Tropics joining. The move effectively folded the IPL as no teams remained in the league.

After rejoining the MASL, the Blast would go on to win their second Eastern Division championship and MASL championship over Soles de Sonora for the second year in a row.

Move to SECU Arena
The Blast announced in August 2017 that they would move from the Royal Farms Arena to the SECU Arena on the campus of Towson University, beginning in the 2017-2018 MASL season. The move was the first time the Blast franchise played home games in an arena other than the Royal Farms Arena. In June 2021 the Blast announced an affiliation partnership with Baltimore Kings, who will be playing their first arena soccer season in MASL 3 in January 2022.

Players

2021–22 roster

Active players
As of 6 July 2020

Inactive players

Staff
  David Bascome – Head coach, (2020–present)

Retired numbers

Hall of Fame

Notable former players
  Denison Cabral
  Jason Dieter
  Levi Houapeu
  Jason Maricle
  Tony McPeak
  Tino Nuñez
  Onua Obasi
  Rusty Troy
  Barry Stitz
  PJ Wakefield
  Tarik Walker

Year-by-year

Records
Statistics below show the all-time regular-season club leaders and include player statistics from the original Baltimore Blast which competed in the Major Indoor Soccer League (1978–1992). Bold indicates active Blast players.

Head coaches
  Kenny Cooper Sr. (1992–1994)
  Dave MacWilliams (1994–1996)
  Mike Stankovic (1996–1998)
  Kevin Healey (1998–2002)
  Sean Bowers (2002)
  Bobby McAvan (2002–2003)
  Tim Wittman (2003–2006)
  Danny Kelly (2006–2020)
  David Bascome (2020–present)

Arenas
 Royal Farms Arena; Baltimore, Maryland (1992–2017) (previously known as Baltimore Civic Center, Baltimore Arena, 1st Mariner Arena)
 SECU Arena; Towson, Maryland (2017–present)

References

External links
 
 Baltimore Blast on FunWhileItLasted.net

 
1992 establishments in Maryland
Indoor soccer clubs in the United States
Major Arena Soccer League teams
Major Indoor Soccer League (2001–2008) teams
Major Indoor Soccer League (2008–2014) teams
Soccer clubs in Maryland
National Professional Soccer League (1984–2001) teams
Soccer clubs in Baltimore
Association football clubs established in 1992